"There'd Better Be a Mirrorball" is a song by English indie rock band Arctic Monkeys released on 29 August 2022, through Domino Recording Company. The song was included on their seventh studio album The Car (2022). Written by lead singer Alex Turner and produced by James Ford, 
"There'd Better Be a Mirrorball" is a traditional pop and jazz track. While composing it, Turner thought the song felt like the start of the record.

Music critics praised "There'd Better Be a Mirrorball"'s production, lyrics, and instrumental arrangement. The song was nominated for Best Alternative Music Performance at the 65th Annual Grammy Awards. It debuted at number 26 on the UK Singles Chart.

Turner directed the accompanying music video which features 1970s-inspired aesthetics and captures the band at different stages of the recording process. The video was also released on 29 August 2022, and filmed by Turner with his own 16mm video camera, alongside Zackery Michael, Ben Chappell, and Mark Bull. Arctic Monkeys performed the song on television shows such as Later...with Jools Holland and Late Night Berlin.

Composition and lyrics
Musically "There'd Better Be a Mirrorball" has been described as a jazz-influenced and "Bond-esque" ballad, being compared to the works of Burt Bacharach and The Walker Brothers. Some music journalists also noted an influence of 1960s pop music and traditional pop on the song.

The song deals with a breakup, and the lyricism has been described as "oblique" and "introspective", with The Guardian noting: "Turner sings about the dying days of a relationship without any of his usual brio. Instead, this song’s refrain almost feels like a plea: “If you wanna walk me to the car / You oughta know I’ll have a heavy heart / So can we please be absolutely sure that there’s a mirrorball?”" Lead singer Alex Turner said of the song: “On Mirrorball, before the words even come in, that instrumental piece [establishes] the feel of the record”, and while composing it thought it felt, “like how the next record starts.”

The string section was recorded at RAK Studios' Studio 1 in London, engineered by long-time Arctic Monkeys collaborator Loren Humphrey.

Music video
The song's music video was directed by lead singer Alex Turner and filmed by Turner and frequent collaborators, Zackery Michael, Ben Chappell, and Mark Bull. The video features the band at different stages of the recording process, at both Butley Priory, and La Frette studios. Turner brought his own 16mm video camera to document the sessions, later compiling his footage for the video.

Critical reception

Writing for Pitchfork, Matthew Strauss noted that the song's production "gesture[s] toward the otherworldly retroism of Tranquility Base Hotel & Casino" while remaining "grounded" lyrically; he opines that the song is "emblematic of a new, post-AM Arctic Monkeys: a little mysterious, yearning, and downcast - and quietly beautiful." Shaad D'Souza of The Guardian wrote, "Arctic Monkeys are clearly still invested in writing ballads that move with the slowness and smoothness of treacle dripping from a spoon. "There'd Better Be a Mirrorball" seems slight at first – but by the time it's over, there's no doubting its power." Stereogum chose the song as one of the best tracks of that week, describing it as "[splitting] the difference between Bond theme and brokenhearted lament" with "Alex Turner’s croon leading the way through exquisite lounge music and a soaring string" arrangement."

Accolades
The song was nominated for Best Alternative Music Performance at the 65th Annual Grammy Awards.

Charts

References

2022 songs
2022 singles
Arctic Monkeys songs
Domino Recording Company singles
Songs written by Alex Turner (musician)
Song recordings produced by James Ford (musician)